Beth Israel Congregation is a Reform synagogue located at 316 Park Avenue in Florence, South Carolina. Formally incorporated with the state of South Carolina in September 1912, Beth Israel grew out of the Florence Hebrew Benevolent Association which was founded in 1887.

, the rabbi was Jeffrey Ronald. A part-time rabbi, Aaron Sherman, became the spiritual leader of Beth Israel in August 2011. Leah Doberne-Schor also serves as a part-time rabbi. For services that are conducted in the absence of a Rabbi, temple members lead services.

Notes

1887 establishments in South Carolina
1912 establishments in South Carolina
Buildings and structures in Florence, South Carolina
Reform synagogues in South Carolina
Religious organizations established in 1887
Jewish organizations established in 1912
Synagogues completed in 1949